Cory Doran (born February 7, 1982) is a Canadian voice actor and director who is known as the voice of Dabio & Rex in the PBS Kids animated series Wild Kratts, and Jimmy, the star of the Breakthrough Entertainment animated show Jimmy Two-Shoes. He also voices the character Mike in the series Total Drama. He took over for Lou Attia as the voice of Fungus in the second season of the YTV/Cartoon Network animated television series, Numb Chucks. He also provides the voice of Bummer in the Teletoon/Cartoon Network series Stoked, and Ace in the Universal Kids animated series Powerbirds. Since 2015, he has been the voice of FX Movie Channel and WildBrainTV.

Filmography

Animation
Jimmy Two-Shoes – Jimmy Two Shoes
Rocket Monkeys – Flowers
Stoked – Andrew "Bummer" Baumer, No Pants Lance and Captain Ron
Total Drama – Mike/Chester/Svetlana/Vito/Manitoba/Mal
Skatoony - Jimmy Two Shoes, Mike/Chester/Svetlana/Vito
Fugget About It – Donnie, Mr. Flip
Oh Noah! – Noah
Gotta Catch Santa Claus (2008) – Trevor Taylor II
Numb Chucks (2015) – Fungus
Transformers: BotBots – Fomo and Wishy-Waffley
George of the Jungle – George, Tookie Tookie
BeyWheelz – Tom (English dub)
BeyWarriors: BeyRaiderz – Domani (English dub)
Arthur – Chip Crosswire, J-Cube
Freaktown – Lenny
Now You See Me 2 – Security Guard's Henchmen, (Uncredited)
Fangbone! – Kael, Skeletom, Hound
Poppets Town – Blooter
Powerbirds – Ace and Asher Stasher
Monster Math Squad – Max
Mysticons – Neeko, Lance O'Lovely
The Cat in the Hat Knows a Lot About That! – Dragon
Luna Petunia – Sammy Stretch
Total DramaRama – Noah
Wild Kratts – Dabio, Shabio, Rex, Kenny
Ollie's Pack – Captain Wowski
Bakugan Battle Planet – Nillious, various additional characters (English dub)
Glowbies – Randy
Thomas & Friends: All Engines Go - Cranky, Troublesome Truck (US) Ultratrain, Negatrain (US/UK; 2021)
Thomas & Friends: Race for the Sodor Cup - Cranky, Troublesome Truck (US)
Rubble & Crew - Speed Meister and Mr. McTurtle

References

External links

1982 births
Living people
Canadian male voice actors
Male actors from Toronto
Canadian voice directors